Irma Ravinale (1 October 19377 April 2013) was an Italian composer and music educator.

Biography
Irma Ravinale was born in Naples, Italy. She studied composition at the Rome Conservatory of Santa Cecilia with Goffredo Petrassi, and continued her studies with Nadia Boulanger in Paris and Karlheinz Stockhausen in Cologne, also studying piano, conducting and choral music. After completing her education, she took a position in 1966 teaching composition at the Conservatory Santa Cecilia in Rome.

Ravinale became director of San Pietro a Maijella Conservatory in Naples where she served until 1989 and then Director of the Conservatory of Santa Cecilia where she served until 1999. She is member of the International Honour Committee of the Fondazione Donne in Musica.

Ravinale died in Rome, Italy, at the age of 75 on 7 April 2013.

Honors and awards
Commander of the Order of Merit of the Italian Republic, Rome, 2 June 1992
Silver medal for meritorious school of art and culture, Rome, 2 June 1994
Gold Medal for Culture and the Arts

Works
Ravinale composes works for symphony orchestra, chamber ensembles and musical theatre. Selected works include:

1965 Scorpion, for chorus a cappella, from Trilussa
1966 Death meditated, cantata for baritone and string quartet
1967 Concerto for oboe, horn, timpani and strings
1967 Ballad of love and war, for soprano, violin, cello and piano
1968 Concerto for Strings
1970 Night Trio for violin, viola d'amore and cello
1970 The Picture of Dorian Gray, play by Oscar Wilde
1971 Invention concerted, for 13 wind instruments
1972 Sinfonia Concertante for guitar and orchestra
1974 Serenade for guitar, flute and viola
1976 Sequentia, for guitar and string quartet
1976 Spleen, for baritone and orchestra (Won an award at the International Competition of Trieste)
1977 Dialogues, for viola, guitar and orchestra
1978 Changeling, for harpsichord and small orchestra
1979 Improvisation for guitar alone
1980 Jontly for two guitars
1980 Recherche, for violin only
1981 But ... what comes after love, for oboe and horn
1981 Improvisation II, for harpsichord
1982 Sombras, for guitar alone
1983 Les Adieux, for violin and orchestra
1984 Per una mano sola, for piano
1984 To Ada, for clarinet
1985 Ode to a star, for organ and concertante string orchestra
1987 Duo for violin and guitar
1987 Untitled, for clarinet and bass clarinet in E flat
1988 Elegy of silence, for chamber orchestra
1989 The Ballad of the vassal, for female voice
1989 Jeux, for guitar
1990 Two arias for baritone voice
1990 Poem for Oscar Romero, for baritone, mixed choir and orchestra
1991 Quintet for oboe, clarinet, bassoon, horn and piano
1992 Nuit, for cello only
1995 Prologue, for narrator and five instruments, from Pier Paolo Pasolini
1996 Sextet for Strings
1997 Pour une etoile, for body only
1999 The Remains of the day, for orchestra
2004 In memory of those we love, for mezzo-soprano, piccolo and orchestra
2004 Ode to friendship, for violin and cello
2005 Second Quintet for two trumpets, trombone, tubacorno and tuba
2005 Puer natus est, for nine male voices
2006 Cadenza, for solo violin
2009 Vaghezie, for cello and soprano
2012 Pour un cher amie, for clarinet and piano

References

1937 births
2013 deaths
20th-century classical composers
Italian music educators
Women classical composers
Italian classical composers
Accademia Nazionale di Santa Cecilia alumni
20th-century Italian composers
Women music educators
20th-century women composers